Virgil Mountain is a mountain in the central part of the state of New York. It is located east-southeast of Virgil in Cortland County. It is the highest point in Cortland County and is ranked 28 of 62 on the list of New York county high points.

References

Mountains of Cortland County, New York
Mountains of New York (state)